The Nightmare Man is a two-part story of the fourth series of the British science fiction television series The Sarah Jane Adventures, which was first broadcast on CBBC on 11 and 12 October 2010.

Plot
Four days before Luke leaves for Oxford University a year early, he starts having nightmares about leaving for university, something that was thought to be impossible since the Bane did not include dreaming in his genetic makeup. In his nightmares, he sees the Nightmare Man, who tells Luke that he cannot tell anyone about him.

On Luke's last night home, the Nightmare Man forces Luke, Clyde, and Rani to have nightmares relating to Luke leaving for university, and begins entering the real world and reaching into the dreams of other humans. Luke's dream is full of red doors similar to his school. He deduces that he, Clyde and Rani are in the same reality and calls to them, telling them to imagine a red door and to walk through it. The three of them are now in the same dream, stopping the Nightmare Man's powers. The Nightmare Man returns to the dream reality.  Luke, Clyde and Rani join hands, and the Nightmare Man is forced into Clyde's nightmare, where he is trapped into listening to Sarah Jane talk about Luke. The next morning, Luke drives off with K9 to university.

Cast notes
Julian Bleach has previously appeared in the Torchwood episode "From Out of the Rain" as the Ghostmaker and Davros in the Doctor Who episodes "The Stolen Earth" and "Journey's End" (both of which also featured Elisabeth Sladen as Sarah Jane Smith) making him one of very few actors to appear in all three shows.

Production

The BBC had originally approached Russell T. Davies and asked him to make a character gay in the show. Davies planned for this character to be Luke, and intended to begin foreshadowing it from The Nightmare Man. However, Davies chose to cut one line which hinted more explicitly at this more development. The line which is cut is from the scene in which Luke saying goodbye to Sarah Jane as he departs for university.

Novelisation

This was the tenth of eleven Sarah Jane Adventures serials to be adapted as a novel. Written by Joseph Lidster, the book has only been published as an E-book on 25 November 2010.

References

External links

2010 British television episodes
Slitheen television stories
The Sarah Jane Adventures episodes
Television episodes about nightmares